Fattburger is a jazz group, best categorized in the jazz-funk, contemporary jazz, or jazz fusion subgenres. The band was formed by saxophonist Hollis Gentry, keyboardist Carl Evans Jr., bassist Mark Hunter, drummer Kevin Koch, and guitarist Steve Laury in San Diego during the early 1980s. Tommy Aros soon joined as a percussionist.

After their first album, Hollis Gentry left the band to pursue a solo career but came back as a part-time member in the 1990s. After the release of Come & Get It, Steve Laury left to embark on a solo career. As a result, their next album, "On a Roll," was the first recording of Fattburger as a four-piece band, although Kiko Cibrian  appeared as a studio guitarist.  After their album Work to Do (2004), Hollis Gentry died on 5 September 2006  and Carl Evans Jr. died on 10 April 2008.

Fattburger reunited to play at the Anthology jazz club on 26 June 2009 with Allan Phillips as a new keyboardist.

Fattburger's most commercially successful albums include Sizzlin'  and T.G.I.F.attburger!

Discography 

 One of a Kind (Golden Boy Jazz, 1986)
 Good News (Intima, 1987)
 Living in Paradise (Intima, 1988)
 Time Will Tell (Intima, 1989)
 Come and Get It (Capitol, 1990)
 On a Roll (Sin-Drome, 1993)
 Livin' Large (Shanachie, 1995)
 All Natural Ingredients (Shanachie, 1996)
 Sugar (Shanachie, 1998)
 Fattburger.com (Shanachie, 2000)
 T.G.I.F.attburger! (Shanachie, 2001)
 Sizzlin'  (Shanachie, 2003)
 Work to Do! (Shanachie, 2004)

See also
Jazz-funk
List of smooth jazz performers
List of funk musicians
List of jazz fusion artists

External links
Official site

References 

Smooth jazz ensembles
Jazz fusion ensembles
American jazz ensembles from California